Carolina  Horta (born 20 August 1992) is a Brazilian beach volleyball player.

Horta won bronze medals at the Pan American Games in 2015, alongside Liliane Maestrini, and 2019, alongside Angela Lavalle.

References

External links
 

1992 births
Living people
Brazilian women's beach volleyball players
Pan American Games medalists in volleyball
Pan American Games bronze medalists for Brazil
Volleyball players at the 2019 Pan American Games
Beach volleyball players at the 2019 Pan American Games
Medalists at the 2015 Pan American Games
Medalists at the 2019 Pan American Games
Beach volleyball players at the 2015 Pan American Games
21st-century Brazilian women